Elena Velez is an American fashion designer and artist from Milwaukee, Wisconsin, based in New York City. Her work is known for its non traditional synthesis of metalsmith and high fashion. Dressing celebrities including Solange Knowles, Ethel Cain, Julia Fox, Eartheater, Arca, and Caroline Polachek, her recent collaborations include custom looks for music artists such as Kali Uchis, Sevdaliza, and Rosalia. Velez was named by I-D Magazine in 2018 as "one of five under the radar designers to discover at New York Fashion Week" after first gaining viral success on VFILES Runway. The brand is represented by Loft Creative Group and made its first official New York Fashion Week debut in September 2021. Velez is a winner of the 2022 CFDA Vogue Fashion Fund, and the American Emerging Designer of the Year at the 2022 CFDA Fashion Awards.

Early life & Inspiration 
Described by Vogue as a "unique take on deconstruction, Velez's current work is inspired by the historic craftsmanship and manufacturing legacy of the American Rust Belt and is the product of collaboration with local metalsmith artisans to revisit the regional craft. Central themes in her work include deconstruction, unconventional femininity, and alternative construction methods, which include "salvaged" and "site-specific materiality". Velez coins her visual identity as "aggressively delicate". Of Puerto Rican heritage but raised in Milwaukee, Wisconsin, Velez claims in recent interviews that the "industrial" nature of her "nontraditional upbringing" as the only child to a single mother who is a ship's captain on the Great Lakes influenced her current artistic identity, which she says draws heavily on "the relationship between femininity and force". With a beginning interest in design from early childhood, the first documentation of her developments appear in local TV news as a teenager in 2010.

Career 
Velez studied at Parsons Paris from 2013 to 2015 and graduated from Parsons School of Design in 2018 with a BFA in fashion design and minor in creative entrepreneurship. Additionally in 2020 she received a Graduate Diploma in fashion design from Central Saint Martins in London. Her BFA thesis collection was shown at VFILES Season 10 Runway, and London Fashion Week, as a guest of the Swedish Fashion Council. In 2019 Velez's work was exhibited as a Teen Vogue 2019 Generation Next designer curated by Editor in Chief of Vogue Magazine's Anna Wintour, and Editor in Chief of NY Magazine's The Cut, Lindsey Peoples as “a designer representing the future of fashion”. Her work has received coverage in Business of Fashion, Women's Wear Daily, WGSN, Vogue, Vogue Runway, i-D Magazine, Dazed, Numero Berlin, Paper Magazine, Office Magazine, CFDA, Schön!, CNN Style, Telemundo, Refinery29, The Wall Street Journal, Forbes, Harpers Bazaar, and New York Times The Cut.

In February, 2021, Elena Velez Industries Inc. was founded with investment support from venture capital firms Gener8tor, and CSA Partners. The company was subsequently featured in Forbes for its work with Midwestern makers and mission to "democratize resources and recognition" for artists outside of traditional creative capitals.

Awards & Showcases 

 Current Finalist, Fashion Trust US Award, New York 2023
 Winner, Best Emerging Designer; CFDA Fashion Awards, New York 2022
 Winner, CFDA Vogue Fashion Fund Award, New York 2022 
 Recipient, IMG Fashion Alliance Grant, New York 2022 
 Winner,Teen Vogue Generation Next, New York 2019 
 Winner,VFILES Season 10 Runway, New York 2018 
 Finalist, Swedish Fashion Council CTF Award, London 2018

Collections 

 Year 3 - How's My Driving?, 2023 
 Year 2 - In Glass, 2022 
 Year 1 - Maidenhood And Its Labors, 2022 
 Year 0 - Rinascita, 2021 
Homecoming, 2019 
 Vessel, 2019 
 _And Carry On, 2018

References

1994 births
Living people
Artists from Milwaukee
American fashion designers
Parsons School of Design alumni
Alumni of Central Saint Martins
Puerto Rican designers